The flag of Cúcuta was created on May 3, 1988 by the mayor of Cúcuta, Carlos A. Rangel, with the decree Number 106.

References

Flag
Flags of municipalities of Colombia
Cúcuta